National Route 5 (N5) forms part of the Philippine highway network. It runs through the province of Capiz to the province of Iloilo, both in the island of Panay.

Route description

Roxas to Iloilo City

Iloilo–Capiz Road

N5 covers the section of Iloilo–Capiz Road from the Roxas City Fountain roundabout in Roxas City, Capiz to its southern terminus at Iloilo–Antique Road (locally known as General Luna Street) in Iloilo City.

Jaro Spur Road

N5 covers Jaro Spur Road (Washington Street), which carries northbound traffic from Jaro Plaza to Cubay-Balabago Road in Iloilo City, as the Iloilo–Capiz Road carries southbound traffic.

Branch in Iloilo City

N5's section that branches off from the old route of Iloilo–Capiz Road at Jaro Plaza covers Mandurriao-Jaro Road (EI98 Street) and the southern section of Sen. Benigno S. Aquino Jr. Avenue (Diversion Road). Just like the older route, it terminates at the Iloilo–Antique Road.

References

Roads in Capiz
Roads in Iloilo